Archibald Gordon (born 1882; died 1967) was a Canadian Baptist missionary who served in India during 1913-1953 with Canadian Baptist Ministries.

Early life and studies
Archibald Gordon was born in Aberdeen, Scotland, in 1882 and went to Canada in 1907.  He enrolled for graduate studies at the Brandon University, Brandon where he took a B.A. and a B.Th. in 1913. He later upgraded his academics by studying for a B.D. degree at the University of Toronto in 1947.

Ecclesiastical career
Gordon served as a Baptist missionary in India in Andhra Pradesh from 1913 to 1953. During the last decade of his presence in India, he became principal of the Baptist Theological Seminary, Kakinada during the period 1945-1952 following which the seminary council of the Baptist Theological Seminary appointed Chetti Bhanumurthy as the first Indian principal of the seminary.

Honours
In 1956, the McMaster University honoured Gordon with a Doctor of Divinity (honoris causa).

References

20th-century Canadian Baptist ministers
Baptist writers
Brandon University alumni
University of Toronto alumni
Telugu people
Christian clergy from Andhra Pradesh
Indian Christian theologians
Indian Baptists
Canadian Baptist Ministries missionaries in India
Academic staff of the Senate of Serampore College (University)
Convention of Baptist Churches of Northern Circars pastors
1882 births
1967 deaths